Limibaculum is a Gram-negative genus of bacteria from the family of Rhodobacteraceae with one known species (Limibaculum halophilum). Limibaculum halophilum has been isolated from mud.

References

Rhodobacteraceae
Bacteria genera
Monotypic bacteria genera